Duncan Cameron "Cam" Reed (July 2, 1815September 14, 1890) was an American steamship engineer and Democratic politician, and an early settler of Milwaukee, Wisconsin.  He served two terms in the Wisconsin State Senate, representing the southern half of Milwaukee County, and was President pro tempore of the Senate for the 1851 and 1853 sessions.  He also briefly served as a Union Army officer in the American Civil War.

Background
Reed was born in Shelburn, Vermont, on July 2, 1815. He became a marine engineer, and had visited Milwaukee at least as early as 1834. He moved to Milwaukee permanently on July 8, 1841, arriving as chief engineer of the steamship City of Milwaukee or Milwaukee (reputedly "the fastest boat on the lakes at that time"), which he had helped to sneak out of the harbor of Buffalo, New York, at the instigation of Solomon Juneau, part-owner thereof, who claimed that the boat was being retained in Buffalo unjustly by the other owners. He remained in the engineering trade, serving on lake steamers such as the C. C. Trowbridge, the Andromeda and the Nucleus. In 1851, he was one of a group (including Alexander Mitchell, George H. Walker, Increase Lapham, and others) which petitioned the State Legislature for a charter for the Milwaukee and Fond du Lac Railroad, one of the short-lived railroad companies which would eventually become part of the Chicago, Milwaukee, St. Paul and Pacific Railroad system.

Public office
As of 1853, he was 37 years of age; his biographical listing showed that he was an "engineer", was born in Vermont and had lived in Wisconsin for 12 years. Reed served four years (1850-1853) as a Democratic member of the State Senate, first from the Eighteenth District, then (after a redistricting) from the Sixth. During the 1851 and 1853 sessions, he served as President pro tempore of the Senate. He was succeeded in the Senate by fellow Democrat Edward McGarry.

He served four years as a deputy United States Marshal; and in 1858 was elected coroner for Milwaukee County.

Military service
In 1853 Reed was a colonel of the 1st Regiment, 1st Division of the Wisconsin Militia under Major General Rufus King.

On August 21, 1862, he was commissioned a captain in the 24th Wisconsin Infantry Regiment (which "Cam" had helped organize) commanding Company "E"; but he was discharged in January 1863.

After the Civil War
After the war, he worked as a professional boiler inspector, billing various state agencies for that service. He was appointed a boiler inspector for the Steamboat Inspection Service of the United States government during the Grant administration, a position he would hold until his death.

Personal life
Reed married Mary Hanes in 1837. An adopted daughter, Frances Dela Bates, died at the age of five in 1854. Mary Hanes Reed died in 1883. They had one daughter, Mary L. (Reed) McIntyre, known as "Mamie", who would survive them both.

Reed was one of the founding members of the Old Settlers Club of Milwaukee and of the State Historical Society of Wisconsin, as well as a state Grand Master of the Odd Fellows fraternal order. Reed Street (later renamed South Second Street) in the old Third Ward of Milwaukee was named after him; when he had first settled there at what would become the corner of Greenfield and Reed Street, it was a mere wilderness trail with but three houses upon it.

He died of dropsy on September 14, 1890, after a long illness. He was buried in Forest Home Cemetery.

References

External links
 

|-

1815 births
1890 deaths
American coroners
Engineers from Wisconsin
American marine engineers
Politicians from Milwaukee
People from Shelburne, Vermont
Democratic Party Wisconsin state senators
Year of death unknown
Deaths from edema
19th-century American politicians